Arminius (18/17 BC – 19 AD) was a Germanic Cherusci chieftain.

Arminius may also refer to:

 Arminius (name), including a list of people with the name 
 Arminius (Bruch), an 1877 oratorio by Max Bruch
 SMS Arminius, an ironclad warship of the Prussian Navy, 1865–1901
 Jacobus Arminius (1560–1609), Dutch Reformed theologian upon whose ideas Arminianism was built; a contrast to Calvinism.

Other
 Arminius is a line of revolvers manufactured by Weihrauch of Germany.

See also
 Arminius Hotel, a historic hotel in Portland, Oregon, United States